Jørgen Hval (8 February 1911 – 24 September 1992) was a Norwegian footballer. He played in six matches for the Norway national football team from 1933 to 1937. He was also part of Norway's team for their qualification matches for the 1938 FIFA World Cup.

References

External links
 

1911 births
1992 deaths
Norwegian footballers
Norway international footballers
Place of birth missing
Association footballers not categorized by position